Mills Orchard is an unincorporated community in Glenn County, California. It lies at an elevation of 177 feet (54 m).

References

Unincorporated communities in California
Unincorporated communities in Glenn County, California